Fridge refers to refrigerator, an electrical appliance.

Fridge may also refer to:
 Fridge (band), a British post-rock band
 Fridge, the verb form of the "fridging" plot device, to which the website Women in Refrigerators is dedicated
 "Nuke the fridge", idiomatic expression for unoriginality in film franchises
 The Fridge (nightclub), a nightclub in Brixton, South London
 William Perry (American football), former professional American football player nicknamed "The Fridge"
 Anthony "Fridge" Johnson, a fictional character from the Jumanji franchise
 Harry Maguire, English professional football player nicknamed "Fridge"